Scopula terrearia is a moth of the family Geometridae. It was described by Paul Mabille in 1900. It is endemic to Madagascar.

References

Moths described in 1900
terrearia
Moths of Madagascar
Endemic fauna of Madagascar